Suzanne Eisendieck (14 November 1906  — 15 June 1998) was a German Post-Impressionist painter native of Danzig.

Biography 

Suzanne Eisendieck was born at Holzraum Platz 2B in Danzig (now Gdańsk in Poland) to German parents Karl Eisendick and Anna Eisendick (née Klegus).

At the age of 12, Suzanne Eisendieck became one of the youngest pupils of the painter Fritz August Pfuhle. When she was 21, she went to study for three years at Berlin State Academy for Fine and Applied Arts, attending the class of Maximilian Klewer, and whilst there took part in an exhibition with over 1400 objects displayed in a group collection. Only 9 were sold and 3 of these were her canvases. This successful show in Berlin enabled her later to travel to Paris where she took residence in a tiny attic of Latin Quarters near the Place St. Michel and started painting. It was a continuous financial struggle for Suzanne until one friend organised for Madame Zak to visit her small studio. She immediately purchased 6 of her paintings and put them in her gallery, Galerie Zak, at the Place Saint Germain des Près.  There they were so much admired that she arranged for the first exhibition of Suzanne Eisendieck works. That was followed later by few others in the Leicester Galleries London. This was also the end of bitter hardship for young artist and the start of great success.

Artistically her work was inspired by the French Impressionists and is in many private collections mostly in America. Majority of her drawings are rapid chalk or pen sketches due to the high demand for new artworks. Suzanne Eisendieck painted in a unique style using oil paint and occasionally pastels.

She became best of friends with Dietz Edzard. It was he who originally introduced Madame Zak to her art. They started painting so much alike that some had difficulty in telling their work apart.

In 1938 Suzanne Eisendieck and Dietz Edzard (1893–1963) got married. They had two children whilst living in Paris, Christine Edzard-Goodwin (1945) married to Richard Goodwin (Sands Films, London) and Angélica Edzard-Károlyi (1947) married to Georges Károlyi, Hungarian ambassador to France (Joseph Károlyi Foundation, Hungary).

Suzanne Eisendieck died in Paris in 1998 and was buried in the Père Lachaise Cemetery.

Gallery

Exhibitions 

 1929 – Jury Free Art Show, Berlin
 1932 – Madame Zak at the Place Saint Germain des Près, Paris
 1934 – Leicester Galleries, London1936 – Leicester Galleries, London1938 – Leicester Galleries, London
 1937 – Marie Harriman Gallery, New York1939 – Marie Harriman Gallery, New York1940 – Marie Harriman Gallery, New York
 1942 – Galerie Benezit, Paris
 1946 – Perls Galleries, New York1948 – Perls Galleries, New York1949 – Perls Galleries, New York
 1950 – Gallery Vigeveno, Los Angeles
 1954 – Exposition Publique Tableaux Moderners, Paris
 1955 – Galerie Petrides, Paris
 1956 – O'Hana Gallery, London
 1959 – Hammer Galleries, New York
 1959 – Findlay Galleries, New York
 1959 – Findlay Galleries, Chicago
 1959 – Findlay Galleries, Palm Beach
 1961 – Adams Gallery, London
 1962 – Galerie Abels, Cologne

Literature 

 "Juryfreie Kunstschau Berlin 1929". Malerei, Graphik, Plastik und Architektur; Landes-Ausstellungsgebäude am Lehrter Bahnhof; Verlag, Berlin 1929 
 "The Studio" Suzanne Eisendieck — Individualist. Vol. CXII – Nr. 522. September 1936
 "Art Digest" Dainty Femininity in Eisendieck Exhibit. 1 December 1937
 "Time" Suzannes. 13 December 1937
 "Allgemeines Lexicon der Bildenden Kunstler des XX. Jahrhundrerts", E. A. Seemann, Leipzig, 1953–62, vol. 2, p. 25 
 "Fritz Pfuhle". Eun Maler aus Danzig von Eberhard Lutze; Holzner Verlag, Würzburg 1966 
 "Suzanne Eisendieck" Peintures Récentes, Préface de Waldemar George 1967 
 "Emmanuel Bénézit, Dictionnaire des Peintres, Sculpteurs, Dessinateurs et Graveurs, Paris, 1976, vol. 4, p. 134 
 "Benezit Dictionary of Artists",  Gründ  2006 Edition Paris, Vol. 5, p. 130

References

External links 
Suzanne Eisendieck Bio – Findlay Galleries
Sands Films, London
 The Joseph Károlyi Foundation, Hungary 
 "Life" Magazine 23 June 1941 Published by Time Inc.

1998 deaths
1906 births
Post-impressionist painters
Artists from Gdańsk
20th-century German painters
German women painters